The Czech Republic national korfball team is managed by the Czech Korfball Association (CKA), representing the Czech Republic in korfball international competitions.

Tournament history

Current squad

References

External links
Český korfbalový svaz

National korfball teams
Korfball
Korfball in the Czech Republic